Aurelius Prudentius Clemens was a Roman Christian poet, born in the Roman province of Tarraconensis (now Northern Spain) in 348. He probably died in the Iberian Peninsula some time after 405, possibly around 413. The place of his birth is uncertain, but it may have been Caesaraugusta (Saragossa), Tarraco (Tarragona), or Calagurris (Calahorra).

Life
Prudentius practiced law with some success, and was twice provincial governor, perhaps in his native country, before the emperor Theodosius I summoned him to court. Towards the end of his life (possibly around 392) Prudentius retired from public life to become an ascetic, fasting until evening and abstaining entirely from animal food; and writing poems, hymns, and controversial works in defence of Christianity. Prudentius later collected the Christian poems written during this period and added a preface, which he himself dated 405.

Poetry
The poetry of Prudentius is influenced by early Christian authors, such as Tertullian and St. Ambrose, as well as the Bible and the acts of the martyrs. His hymn Da, puer, plectrum (including "Corde natus ex parentis": "Of the Father's Love Begotten") and the hymn for Epiphany O sola magnarum urbium ("Earth Has Many A Noble City"), both from the Cathemerinon, are still in use today.

The allegorical Psychomachia, however, is his most influential work, incorporating as it did elements of both Hellenic epic and inner psychological conflict. It became the inspiration and wellspring of medieval allegorical literature, its influence (according to C. S. Lewis) exceeding its intrinsic artistic merit. In the battle between virtue and vice, full weight is given to the power of Luxuria, “Flowershod and swaying from the wine cup, Every step a fragrance”. With her attendants Beauty and Pleasure, and her weapons of rose-petals and violets, she succeeds in swaying the army of Virtue “in surrender to love”, before succumbing to ultimate defeat.

Influence
With his merger of Christianity with classical culture, Prudentius was one of the most popular medieval authors, being aligned as late as the 13th century alongside such figures as Horace and Statius in Henri d'Andeli's Battle of the Seven Arts between Grammar (poetry) and Logic.

Works
The list of Prudentius's works given in the preface to his autobiography mentions the hymns, poems against the Priscillianists and against Symmachus and Peristephanon. The Diptychon is not mentioned. The twelve hymns of the Cathemerinon liber ("Daily Round") consist of six for daily use, five for festivals, and one intended for every hour of the day.

The specific works include:

 Liber Cathemerinon -- ("Book in Accordance with the Hours") comprises 12 lyric poems on various times of the day and on church festivals.
 Liber Peristephanon -- ("Crowns of Martyrdom") contains 14 lyric poems on Spanish and Roman martyrs. Some were suggested to Prudentius by sacred images in churches or by the inscriptions of Pope Damasus I.
 Apotheosis -- ("Deification") attacks disclaimers of the Trinity and the divinity of Jesus.
 Hamartigenia -- ("The Origin of Sin") attacks the Gnostic dualism of Marcion and his followers. In this and the Apotheosis, Tertullian is the source of inspiration.
 Psychomachia -- ("Battle of Souls") describes the struggle of faith, supported by the cardinal virtues, against idolatry and the corresponding vices.
 Libri contra Symmachum -- ("Books Against Symmachus") oppose the pagan senator Symmachus's requests that the altar of Victory, which had been removed by Gratian, be restored to the Senate house.
 Dittochæon -- ("The Double Testament") contains 49 quatrains intended as captions for the murals of a basilica in Rome.

Editions
 Bergman, J. (ed.). Aurelii Prudenti Clementis carmina. Vienna: Hölder-Pichler-Tempsky, 1926. (Corpus Scriptorum Ecclesiasticorum Latinorum, 61).
 Cunningham, M.P. (ed.). Aurelii Prudentii Clementis Carmina. Turnhout: Brepols, 1966 (Corpus Christianorum. Series Latina, 126).
 Thomson, H.J. (ed. and trans.). Prudentius. 2 vols. Cambridge, Massachusetts: Harvard University Press, 1949-53 (Loeb Classical Library).
 Tränkle, H. (ed.). Prudentius, Contra Symmachum - Gegen Symmachus. Turnhout: Brepols, 2008. 284 p. (Fontes Christiani, 85).

See also

References

Further reading
 Albrecht, M. von. 1997. "Prudentius." In A History of Roman Literature: From Livius Andronicus to Boethius with Special Regard to its Influence on World Literature. Vol. 2. By M. von Albrecht. Leiden, The Netherlands: Brill.
 Cameron, A. 2011. The last Pagans of Rome. New York: Oxford Univ. Press.
 Conybeare, C. 2007. "Sanctum, Lector, Percense Volumen: Snakes, Readers, and the Whole Text in Prudentius’s Hamartigenia." In The Early Christian Book. Edited by W. E. Klingshirn and L. Safran, 225–240. Washington, DC: Catholic Univ. of America Press.
 Deferrari, Roy J., and James Marshall Campbell. 1932. A Concordance of Prudentius. Cambridge, Mass.: The Mediaeval Academy of America.
 Dykes, A. 2011. Reading Sin in the World: The Hamartigenia of Prudentius and the Vocation of the Responsible Reader. Cambridge, UK: Cambridge Univ. Press.
 Fux, P.-Y. 2003. Les sept passions de Prudence (Peristephanon 2.5.9. 11–14): Introduction générale et commentaire. Fribourg, Switzerland: Éditions Univ. Fribourg Suisse.
 Fux, Pierre-Yves. 2013. Prudence et les martyrs: hymnes et tragédie (Peristephanon 1.3-4.6-8.10). Commentaire , Paradosis 55, Fribourg.
Gnilka, Christian 2000: Prudentiana I. Critica. K. G. Saur, München.
Gnilka, Christian 2001: Prudentiana II. Exegetica. K. G. Saur, München.
Gnilka, Christian 2003: Prudentiana III. Supplementum. K. G. Saur, München.
Gnilka, Christian 2017: Contra orationem Symmachi, Eine kritische Revue. Aschendorff, Münster.
Gnilka, Christian 1963: Studien zur Psychomachie des Prudentius (= Klassisch-Philologische Studien 27), Harrassowitz, Wiesbaden.
 Krollpfeifer, Lydia 2017.  Rom bei Prudentius. Dichtung und Weltanschauung in »Contra orationem Symmachi« (=Vertumnus. Berliner Beiträge zur Klassischen Philologie und zu ihren Nachbargebieten. Vol. 12). Goettingen: Edition Ruprecht.
 Lease, Emory B. 1895. A Syntactic, Stylistic and Metrical Study of Prudentius. Baltimore: The Friedenwald Company.
 Malamud, M. 1989. A Poetics of Transformation: Prudentius and Classical Mythology. Ithaca, NY, and London: Cornell Univ. Press.
 Malamud, M. A. 1990. "Making a Virtue of Perversity: The Poetry of Prudentius." In The Imperial Muse: Ramus Essays on Roman Literature of the Empire. Edited by A. J. Boyle, 64–88. Bendigo, Australia: Aureal.
 Mastrangelo, M. 2008. The Roman Self in Late Antiquity: Prudentius and the Poetics of the Soul. Baltimore: Johns Hopkins Univ. Press
 O’Daly, G. 2011. "Choosing to be a Christian poet: Prudentius, Praefatio and Cathemerinon 2.37–56." In Noctes Sinenses: Festschrift für Fritz-Heiner Mutschler zum 65. Geburtstag. Edited by A. Heil, M. Korn, and J. Sauer, 373–378. Heidelberg, Germany: Winter.
 Palmer, A.M. 1989. Prudentius on the Martyrs. Oxford: Clarendon.
 Pucci, J. 1991. "Prudentius’ Readings of Horace in the Cathemerinon." Latomus 50:677–690.
 Roberts, M. 1993. Poetry and the Cult of the Martyrs: The Liber Peristephanon of Prudentius. Ann Arbor: Univ. of Michigan Press.
 Roberts, M. 2001. "Rome Personified, Rome Epitomized: Representations of Rome in the Poetry of the Early Fifth Century." American Journal of Philology 122:533–565.
 Witke, C. 1968. "Prudentius and the Tradition of Latin Poetry." Transactions of the American Philological Association 99:509–525.

External links

 Works by Prudentius at Perseus Digital Library
 
 
 Prudentius, Loeb Classical Library, Volume I - Latin and English, H. J. Thomson, 1949
 Prudentius, Loeb Classical Library, Volume II - Latin and English, H. J. Thomson, 1953
 Liber peristephanon - Latin text.
 The Catholic Encyclopedia
 The Christian Classics Ethereal Library
 Opera Omnia by Migne's Patrologia Latina with analytical indexes

Romans from Hispania
Christian writers
Christian poets
4th-century Romans
5th-century Romans
4th-century Christians
5th-century Christians
4th-century Latin writers
5th-century Latin writers
4th-century Roman poets
5th-century Roman poets
5th-century deaths
Year of birth unknown
Year of death unknown
Aurelii